Philodromus rufus, also known as the White-striped Running Crab Spider is a species of running crab spider in the family Philodromidae. It is found in North America, Europe, Turkey, Caucasus, Russia (Sibiria), Central Asia, China, Korea, and Japan.

Subspecies
These five subspecies belong to the species Philodromus rufus:
 (Philodromus rufus rufus) Walckenaer, 1826
 Philodromus rufus jenningsi Cutler, 2003
 Philodromus rufus pacificus Banks, 1898
 Philodromus rufus quartus Dondale & Redner, 1968
 Philodromus rufus vibrans Dondale, 1964

References

Further reading

External links

 

rufus
Articles created by Qbugbot
Spiders described in 1826